Akkaldaama is a 1975 Indian Malayalam film, directed and produced by Madhu. The film stars Madhu, Srividya, KPAC Lalitha and Gangadharan in the lead roles. The film had musical score by Shyam.

Cast
 
Madhu 
Srividya 
KPAC Lalitha 
Gangadharan
Kallayam Krishnadas
Manavalan Joseph 
Sankaradi 
Suresh
Babu Jaya 
Chandraji
Kochaniyan
Kottarakkara Sreedharan Nair 
Kottayam Narayanan
K. V. Shanthi 
Sreeni
Sudevan
Sundaresan
Treesa
Usharani

Soundtrack
The music was composed by Shyam.

References

External links
 

1975 films
1970s Malayalam-language films